Aikaterini Oikonomopoulou or Katerina Oikonomopoulou (born February 16, 1978) is a female Greek water polo player and Olympic silver medalist with the Greece women's national water polo team.

She received a silver medal at the 2004 Summer Olympics in 2004 Athens.

She received a gold medal with the Greek team at the 2005 FINA Women's Water Polo World League in Kirishi.

See also
 Greece women's Olympic water polo team records and statistics
 List of Olympic medalists in water polo (women)

References

External links
 

1978 births
Living people
Greek female water polo players
Olympic water polo players of Greece
Water polo players at the 2004 Summer Olympics
Water polo players at the 2008 Summer Olympics
Olympic silver medalists for Greece
Olympic medalists in water polo
Medalists at the 2004 Summer Olympics
Ethnikos WPC
Ethnikos Piraeus Water Polo Club players
Water polo players from Athens
21st-century Greek women